Gahnia pauciflora, commonly called cutting sedge, is a native sedge of New Zealand. It is found throughout the North Island and top of the South Island of New Zealand.

The specific epithet pauciflora is Latin for 'few-flowered'.

G. pauciflora is a host and food plant for the rare forest ringlet butterfly.

References

pauciflora
Flora of New Zealand
Plants described in 1868